Pedro de la Portilla was an 18th-century Criollo rebel in New Spain against the Spanish. He was the leader of the Conspiracy of the Machetes (Spanish: la conspiración de los machetes), an unsuccessful rebellion in 1799. Although the conspiracy posed no threat to Spanish rule, nevertheless it was a shock to the rulers. Coming only 11 years before the Grito de Dolores, it is considered in modern Mexico to be a forerunner of the Mexican War of Independence.

See also
Conspiracy of the Machetes

References
 "Azanza, Miguel José de," Enciclopedia de México, v. 2. Mexico City: 1987.
 "Portilla, Pedro," Enciclopedia de México, v. 11. Mexico City: 1987.
 Orozco L., Fernando, Fechas Históricas de México. Mexico City: Panorama Editorial, 1988, .
 Orozco Linares, Fernando, Gobernantes de México. Mexico City: Panorama Editorial, 1985, .

External links
 Castillo Guerra, Hernando, Diálogos en el Pantéon Liberal de México (p. 151)

Colonial Mexico
Mexican War of Independence
19th-century deaths
Year of death missing
Year of birth missing